Nové Hrady is a municipality and village in Ústí nad Orlicí District in the Pardubice Region of the Czech Republic. It has about 300 inhabitants.

Administrative parts
Villages of Mokrá Lhota and Rybníček are administrative parts of Nové Hrady.

Etymology

After the settlement was founded, it was called Boží Dům (i.e. "God's house") after the first church built in the area. When the old castle was replaced by a new one, the village was renamed Nové Hrady (literally "new castles").

Geography
A set of ponds in located in the village and is supplied by a local brook.

History
The first written mention of Nové Hrady is from 1293. At that time, the village belonged to the Litomyšl estate and shared its owner. A late Gothic castle was built on the site of an old castle in 1442–1468 by the then-owner of Litomyšl, Zdeněk Kostka of Postupice, and established the Nové Hrady estate. The Gothic castle was rebuilt into a Renaissance residence in the 15th century, but during the Thirty Years' War, it was looted and destroyed by Swedish army.

Nové Hrady saw its rise in the 18th century. In 1750, the French aristocratic Harbuval de Chamarè family bought the estate and had built the Nové Hrady Château. The family gradually became poorer, so at the beginning of the 20th century, they sold the estate.

Sights

Nové Hrady is known for Nové Hrady Château. It was built in the Rococo style in 1773–1777, in the style of French summer residence. The castle is nicknamed "Czech Versailles" and "Little Schönbrunn. The building is unique within the country for the style in which it was built and because it was never rebuilt. It is privately owned, but it is open to the public and offers sightseeing tours. The castle is surrounded by several gardens and with and English-style park, in which a hill with ruins of the former Gothic castle is located.

Other sights include the Stations of the Cross in the English park from 1767, and the Baroque Church of Saint James the Great from 1724.

References

External links

Nové Hrady Château

Villages in Ústí nad Orlicí District